Wettinia fascicularis is a species of flowering plant in the family Arecaceae. It is found in Colombia and Ecuador.

References

fascicularis
Flora of Colombia
Flora of Ecuador
Least concern plants
Taxonomy articles created by Polbot
Taxa named by Max Burret